Gambarov is an Azerbaijani masculine surname, its feminine counterpart is Gambarova. It may refer to
Elnur Gambarov (born 1978), Azerbaijani futsal defender
Elshan Gambarov (born 1972), Azerbaijani footballer midfielder
Salman Gambarov (born 1959), Azerbaijani jazz pianist and composer

Azerbaijani-language surnames